This is a list of games on the Wii video game console that use the console's Wi-Fi connection, over external (i.e. Nintendo's) servers. Additionally, the now-defunct WiiConnect24 connection had provided a method for some Wii games to interact online, but rather in a passive method from console to console.

After Nintendo's termination of the free Nintendo Wi-Fi Connection service on May 20, 2014, the majority of the game titles remain virtually playable, but their online connectivity and functionality are rendered defunct, even after some of them were re-released digitally. However, some online games which ran on non-Nintendo servers, such as Call of Duty: Black Ops, are still playable online.

Pay & Play is a service by Nintendo that allowed gamers to download new content for already purchased games. To get the updates, however, you'll have to pay for it as the name suggests. Games that feature a Pay & Play service will feature a logo on the boxart, similar to the Nintendo Wifi Connection. The first game to include a Pay & Play service was the WiiWare video game Final Fantasy Crystal Chronicles: My Life as a King.

Released games
See connection type legend

Wii

WiiWare

Unreleased games

Wii

Legend

See also
 Nintendo Wi-Fi Connection
 List of Wii games
 List of WiiWare games
 List of Wii games using WiiConnect24
 List of Nintendo 3DS Wi-Fi Connection games
 List of Nintendo DS Wi-Fi Connection games
 WiiConnect24
 Wii

Nintendo-related lists
 
 
Multiplayer online games